Bentley is a town in central, Alberta, Canada within Lacombe County.

History 
The first settlers came from the U.S. in 1888-1890 and either walked or drove oxen from Lacombe, which was the closest railroad station at that time. Post office opened in 1901. The first church was built in 1890 by the Methodists, and a schoolhouse was built in 1903. Bentley was incorporated as a village on March 17, 1915.

A disastrous fire destroyed all buildings on the south side of the community in 1916. In 1930, a centre boulevard was constructed for fire protection and street lights installed.

Bentley was incorporated as a town on January 1, 2001.

Town name 
Bentley was named in honour of George Bentley, an early homesteader and sawyer, however at the time it was a controversial choice. When Major William B. McPherson, a U.S. Civil War veteran, opened a post office, settlers preferred McPherson's name, but they were outnumbered by the sawmill employees, who wanted Bentley. Prior to 1915, a petition was formed regarding the naming of the village. The original names of Oxford and Springdale were turned down as these two names had been frequently used across Canada.

Demographics 

In the 2016 Census of Population conducted by Statistics Canada, the Town of Bentley recorded a population of 1,078 living in 441 of its 463 total private dwellings, a  change from its 2011 population of 1,073.

Education 
Bentley has one public school, Bentley School (kindergarten to grade 12), administered by Wolf Creek Public Schools.

Notable people
Clayton Beddoes, former NHL player with the Boston Bruins and ice hockey coach

See also 
List of communities in Alberta
List of towns in Alberta

References

External links 

1915 establishments in Alberta
Towns in Alberta